Barry Kirk Jackman (born March 16, 1981 in Brooklyn, New York, United States) is a Barbadian judoka, who competed in the men's half-heavyweight category. He attained a seventh-place finish in the 100-kg division at the 2003 Pan American Games in Santo Domingo, Dominican Republic, and represented his nation Barbados at the 2004 Summer Olympics. Jackman is also a full-fledged member of Starrett Judo Club in Brooklyn, New York, and the Barbados Olympic squad, under head coach Ian Waithers.

Jackman qualified as a lone judoka for the Barbadian team in the men's half-heavyweight class (100 kg) at the 2004 Summer Olympics in Athens, by granting a tripartite invitation from the International Judo Federation. He lost his opening match to Australia's Martin Kelly, who performed an uki waza (floating drop) to crush him on the tatami for an ippon victory at one minute and forty-two seconds.

References

External links

1981 births
Living people
Barbadian male judoka
Olympic judoka of Barbados
Judoka at the 2004 Summer Olympics
Judoka at the 2002 Commonwealth Games
Judoka at the 2003 Pan American Games
People from Brooklyn
Sportspeople from New York (state)
American male judoka
Commonwealth Games competitors for Barbados
Pan American Games competitors for Barbados